The International Journal for Numerical Methods in Fluids is a peer-reviewed scientific journal covering developments in numerical methods applied to fluid dynamics. It is published by John Wiley & Sons. Its editors-in-chief is Charbel Farhat (Stanford University). The journal was established in 1981.

References

External links 
 

English-language journals
Publications established in 1981
Fluid dynamics journals
Wiley (publisher) academic journals
Journals published between 27 and 51 times per year